Statistics of Czechoslovak First League in the 1966–67 season.

Overview
It was contested by 14 teams, and Sparta Prague won the championship. Jozef Adamec was the league's top scorer with 21 goals.

Stadia and locations

League standings

Results

Top goalscorers

References

Czechoslovakia - List of final tables (RSSSF)

Czechoslovak First League seasons
Czech
1966–67 in Czechoslovak football